Edward Wallowitch (May 5, 1932 – March 25, 1981) was an American art photographer who at age 17 had three prints in the collection of the Museum of Modern Art in New York, the youngest photographer to be so honored, and who collaborated with Andy Warhol. He was active from the 1940s to the 1970s.

Biography
Edward Wallowitch was born on 5 May 1932 in Philadelphia, Pennsylvania in the United States. His parents ran a delicatessen and both sides of the family descended from late nineteenth century Lithuanian immigrants.

Edward began taking photos when he was eleven and by 1949 his pictures, two made with a Kodak Brownie while he was still at school, were purchased for the collection of the Museum of Modern Art. One was included in Photographs by 51 Photographers, August 1–September 17, 1950 at the Museum, and others in its Christmas Photographs, November 29, 1951 – January 6, 1952.

During 1953/4, Wallowitch photographed for the Philadelphia Housing Association which maintained that housing problems and poor polities were intimately related to the City's social conditions and was making a comprehensive longitudinal documentation of poor living conditions and sanitary problems. Wallowitch's contributions represent the nascence of an ongoing subject matter in his work; children, as indicated in the titles of those in the Housing Association of Delaware Valley Records held in Temple University Library, for example, 'Coleman Children: 914 W. Master Street (S.W. Temple Redevelopment Area; Now Demolished) 12 Photos. April, 1954, Girl, Vicinity Of 10th & Master Street. April, 1954, Boys, Vicinity Of 10th & Master Streets. April, 1954.

New York 
Wallowitch and two of his three siblings, John and Anna Mae began their careers in New York City's Greenwich Village in the mid-1950s. Edward's brother studied music at the Juilliard and his first album This is John Wallowitch!!! (1964) featured cover art by Andy Warhol. Their sister posed for Warhol and acted for a time as his agent. Warhol and Edward formed a relationship, both personal (Andy called Edward his ‘first boyfriend’) and artistic; it is likely that the photos on which Warhol's album cover art is based are by Edward, though he is not given credit. They attended parties together and photographed the guests, a practice Andy continued at Studio 54 and at The Factory.

Robert Heide describes the brothers’ rich cultural milieu:

Wallowitch was among the photographers who exhibited at Helen Gee's Limelight gallery, then the only photography gallery in New York.

Of Edward's photographs of children and teenagers in the grimy urban landscape, two were chosen by Edward Steichen for the world-touring Museum of Modern Art exhibition The Family of Man, seen by 9 million visitors during the 1950s and 60s. In one, a little boy hides his face inside the oversize suit jacket worn by an older boy, presumably his brother, who peers wryly at the camera. It is clear, as evidenced in the series from which the picture comes, that Wallowitch was adept at gaining the confidence of this young subjects. In other shots the two boys pose with others on the steps of a drug store, and in one instance a starling perches on the shoulder of the street-smart older boy who, with a straw in his mouth, peers at it with raised eyebrow from under his carefully brylcreemed quiff. Wallowitch's other picture selected pans with slow shutter speed on a little girl in a white dress who passes discarded paper wrapping as she runs; the blurred image results in the paper merging with her light-toned clothing and reads as an angel's wings. Wallowitch was the youngest contributing photographer to The Family of Man.

In 1956 Wallowitch's pictures of children's’ chalk drawings traced from shadows on the pavement were featured in Design magazine and in Life in 1957.

Photographic collaboration with Andy Warhol 
Photos from Wallowitch's series on children and teens appeared in Warhol's lushly presented A Gold Book (1957) printed on gold-coated paper with tissue in pastel hues laid between the pages, though it also features more explicitly erotic content, including a portrait of a man clenching a rose between his teeth while drawing another man's naked posterior. With his training in fashion illustration and graphic design, Warhol habitually used the expedient of tracing photographs projected with an epidiascope resulting in the Wallowitch photographs undergoing a subtle transformation during Warhol's often cursory tracing of contours and hatching of shadows. Warhol also used Wallowitch's photograph Young Man Smoking a Cigarette(c.1956), for his 1958 design for a book cover he submitted to Simon and Schuster for the Walter Ross pulp novel The Immortal, also for his dollar bill series, and for Big Campbell’s Soup Can with Can Opener (Vegetable), of 1962 which initiated Warhol's most sustained motif, the soup can.

In 1966 Wallowitch photographed for a book about the Appalachian Mountains titled My Appalachia by the children's author Rebecca Caudill.

Florida
Wallowitch moved to Florida, taking a studio there sometime in 1967 to ‘retire’ as he told Connie Houser, wife of artist Jim Houser. There he concentrated on portraits of teenagers in the 1970s, before his death from unknown causes on 25 March 1981 at Lake Worth.

In 1995 Photographs, in memory of Edward and conceived by Lynn Lobban, performed by John Wallowitch and Lobban, and directed by Peter Schlosser, was staged at Don’t Tell Mama cabaret in New York.

Exhibitions
Exhibitions at The Museum of Modern Art:
 Photographs from the Museum Collection, November 26, 1958 – January 18, 1959
 The Family of Man, January 24–May 8, 1955
 Christmas Photographs, November 29, 1951 – January 6, 1952
 Photographs by 51 Photographers, August 1–September 17, 1950

References

American photographers
1932 births
1981 deaths
American people of Lithuanian descent
Social documentary photographers
Photographers from Philadelphia
People from Philadelphia